Excision is a 2012 American psychological horror film written and directed by Richard Bates, Jr., and starring AnnaLynne McCord, Traci Lords, Ariel Winter, Roger Bart, Jeremy Sumpter, Malcolm McDowell, Matthew Gray Gubler, Marlee Matlin, Ray Wise, and John Waters. The film is a feature-length adaptation of the 2008 short film of the same name. Excision premiered at the 2012 Sundance Film Festival. Excision played in the category of Park City at Midnight.

Plot
Pauline is a disturbed and delusional high school student with aspirations of a career as a surgeon. Her family is dysfunctional; her younger sister Grace suffers from cystic fibrosis, and her controlling, strongly Christian mother Phyllis shares a strained marriage with Pauline's father, Bob. Pauline has vivid dreams about herself and others being mutilated with excessive amounts of blood, after which she wakes panting in an orgasmic state.

Pauline decides to lose her virginity to a boy named Adam, and wants to do so while on her period due to her fascination with blood. She and Adam have sex, and as she has an orgasm, she imagines herself choking Adam and the bed filling with blood. She then asks Adam to perform oral sex on her. Unaware that she is menstruating, he obliges, only to run to the bathroom in disgust when he sees the blood.

During sex education class, Pauline takes a sample of her blood and puts it under a microscope to check for STDs. She later approaches Adam while he is with his girlfriend Natalie and alludes to their encounter, leading to Natalie breaking up with him. Natalie and her friend subsequently throw toilet paper on Pauline's house and spray paint profanities on it. At school the next day, Pauline physically assaults both Adam and Natalie, resulting in her being expelled.

Pauline overhears her parents discussing Grace's doctor's plans to put her on a waiting list to receive a lung transplant. That night, Grace suffers a severe coughing fit. In the morning, Pauline drugs her father with tea and ties him up before confronting a neighbor who lives across the street who had rebuffed Pauline's earlier attempts at friendship. She lures the girl to her backyard and uses chemicals to knock her out, subsequently drugging Grace.

Pauline cuts and shaves her own hair before transplanting the healthy girl's lungs into Grace's body, placing Grace's diseased lungs on ice, and stitching both girls up. Phyllis arrives home and panics at the sight of her husband bound and gagged, frantically screaming and searching the house for Grace. She finds Pauline in the garage with the bodies. Pauline explains that it is her first surgery, and urges her mother to take a closer look. Phyllis screams hysterically before embracing her. Pauline at first smiles proudly, but then begins to wail as she apparently realizes what she has done.

Cast
 AnnaLynne McCord as Pauline
 Traci Lords as Phyllis
 Ariel Winter as Grace
 Roger Bart as Bob
 Jeremy Sumpter as Adam
 Malcolm McDowell as Mr. Cooper
 Matthew Gray Gubler as Mr. Claybaugh
 Marlee Matlin as Amber
 Ray Wise as Principal Campbell
 John Waters as William
 Molly McCook as Natalie
 Natalie Dreyfuss as Abigail
 Cole Bernstein as Kimberly
 Emily Bicks as Breanna
 Brennan Bailey as Sebastian
 Matthew Fahey as Nathan
 Sidney Franklin as Timothy

Production

Excision is Richard Bates, Jr.'s first feature film. Bates, a Virginia native and graduate of the New York University Tisch School of the Arts, filmed Excision over 28 days in and around Los Angeles, California.

Reception
The review aggregation website Rotten Tomatoes gives the film a score of 85%, based on reviews from 25 critics, with an average rating of 6.56/10. The website's consensus reads, "Excision effectively blends body horror and adolescent drama, although its visceral aggression definitely isn't for all tastes."

Robert Koehler of Variety called it "technically polished juvenilia that provokes without resonance".  At The A.V. Club, two critics reviewed it at Sundance.  Noel Murray rated it B+ and wrote, "This is one of the damnedest 'adolescent misfit' movies you'll ever see—for those who can stomach the splatter, that is." Nathan Rabin rated it B+ and called it "a supremely nasty piece of work in the best way possible."  Steve Rose of The Guardian rated it 2/5 stars and wrote, "This body-horror teen effort could have [been] Cronenberg meets Solondz – but it isn't". Witney Seibold of IGN rated it 7.5/10 and wrote, "Excision is twisted, ballsy, nasty, kind of gross, and more than a little bit disturbing." Streiber states it "revels a little too much in its gore" and seems as though it is a splatter film "only intended to shock", though the ending "clearly accentuates the tragedy of its clearly insane main character."

References

External links
 
 
 

2012 films
2012 horror films
2012 independent films
2010s psychological horror films
2010s teen horror films
American independent films
American psychological horror films
American splatter films
American teen horror films
Films about virginity
Films set in Virginia
Films shot in Los Angeles County, California
2012 directorial debut films
2010s English-language films
Films directed by Richard Bates Jr.
2010s American films